John Ferneley College is a mixed college located in Melton Mowbray in the English county of Leicestershire. The college is part of the Mowbray Education Trust, a multi-academy trust that includes JFC and several primary schools in the local area. The college is named after John Ferneley, a painter who lived in Melton Mowbray, and who is regarded as one of the great British equine artists. The college has specialist status in Business and Enterprise. Previously a community school administered by Leicestershire County Council, John Ferneley College converted to academy status in November 2011. However the college continues to coordinate with Leicestershire County Council for admissions.

Facilities
A new college building was opened at the old Ferneley site in April 2010, and a spillover building, known as the enrichment centre,  was opened in March 2012. The college features many double sized classrooms, which can accommodate up to sixty students at once and are used for team-teaching. As part of the corporate image of the college, no displays of student work are permitted in classrooms, which are instead painted white with a bold single colour feature wall.  In 2019, a new area was built primarily for language lessons which was officially made part of the “culture zone”.

Learning zones 
The college operates a distinct internal structure where subject areas are grouped together into "learning zones". There are five learning zones, each one centred around a central foyer known as a "breakout area". The breakout areas are multi use areas, being used as classrooms, dining areas and social spaces.

The learning zones are:

 Communication zone: English, Mathematics
 Culture zone: French, Geography, German, History, Religious Studies, Spanish
 Discovery zone: Health and Social Care, Personal, Social, Health, Citizenship and Economic Education (PSHCEE), Science
 Enterprise zone: Business Studies, Computer Science, DT (Design Technology), Food Tech
 Performance zone: Art, Ceramics, Dance, Drama, Music, Physical Education

Concerns and criticisms 
In July 2021, the school received criticism in the local and national media for a new behaviour policy which is to be implemented by Natalie Teece at the start of the 2021–2022 academic year. These newer rules require pupils to smile at all times, make continuous eye contact with staff, to not look out of windows, to never turn around (even after hearing a noise from behind),  to always sit up straight, to walk in single file at all times, to not pick up stationery unless specifically directed to do so by staff, to learn and respond to a series of whistle commands from staff, to always respond to staff in a sufficiently upbeat manner and to be constantly grateful that they have the privilege to be at the school.

Gallery

References

External links
John Ferneley College official website
Mowbray Education Trust official website

Secondary schools in Leicestershire
Academies in Leicestershire
Melton Mowbray